Alvand is a mountain in Iran.

Alvand may also refer to:
Əlvənd, a village in Azerbaijan
Alvand, Iran, a city in Qazvin Province, Iran
Alvand, Kohgiluyeh and Boyer-Ahmad, a village in Kohgiluyeh and Boyer-Ahmad Province, Iran
Alvand, South Khorasan, a village in South Khorasan Province, Iran
Alvand, Zanjan, a village in Zanjan Province, Iran
Alvand Rural District (disambiguation), administrative subdivisions of Iran
Iranian frigate Alvand
Alvand-class frigate